Ribstone is a hamlet in central Alberta, Canada within the Municipal District of Wainwright No. 61.

History 
The community was settled in 1905 by wagon.

Demographics 
The population of Ribstone according to the 2007 municipal census conducted by the Municipal District of Wainwright No. 61 is 30.

See also 
List of communities in Alberta
List of hamlets in Alberta

References 

Hamlets in Alberta
Municipal District of Wainwright No. 61